Mochlus guineensis, the Guinean forest skink, is a species of skink. It is found in southern West Africa and in Cameroon in the westernmost Central Africa, but possibly also further east. It occurs in savanna and farmbush habitats, including gallery forest and densely wooded humid savanna.

References

Mochlus
Reptiles described in 1879
Taxa named by Wilhelm Peters
Skinks of Africa
Reptiles of West Africa
Reptiles of Cameroon
Reptiles of Nigeria